Saeed Shirkavand was Vice Minister in the Ministry of Economic Affairs and Finance (Iran) under former Minister Safdar Hosseini in the government of President Mohammad Khatami.

He is an assistant professor in management faculty of University of Tehran, beloved by students according to many surveys.

In addition he is a member of Islamic Iran Participation Front and Islamic Iran Participation Front's Central Council.

See also
List of contemporary Iranian scientists, scholars, and engineers
Ministry of Economic Affairs and Finance (Iran)
وزارت امور اقتصادی و دارایی

References 

Iranian Vice Ministers
Living people
Islamic Iran Participation Front politicians
Year of birth missing (living people)